Máire Bheag Breathnach is an Irish actress.

Breathnach played the part of Mo Gilmartin on the Irish language drama, Ros na Rún, from 2002 to 2021.

She is a native of Cnoc Leitirmullen, in Galway, and won the County football final with her local team.  She has been an actress since working on a short film by Paul Mercier in 1998.

She is now working as a floor manager in ros na Rún since 2021.

She recently worked as a stage manager with An Taibhdhearc with their new play Baile Beag Mór.

See also

 Breathnach

External links
 Interview: 8 Questions with ... Marie Bheag Breathnach

Actresses from County Galway
Irish soap opera actresses
Living people
Year of birth missing (living people)